This is a list of Indian Ambassadors to Madagascar. Indian Embassy opened in Madagascar in 1960. Earlier India had opened a Consulate General in 1954 which was upgraded into an Embassy in 1960 after Madagascar became an independent country in 1960. Currently the Indian Ambassador in Antananarivo is also accredited to Comoros.

List of Indian Ambassadors to Madagascar

See also
 Embassy of India, Madagascar
 India–Madagascar_relations
 Indians in Madagascar

References 

 Embassy of India, Madagascar, Ambassadors
 Embassy of India, Antananarivo, Official website
 MEA Official website

External links
 Ministry of External Affairs, Official website

India
Madagascar